Raymond Jerome Cazeaux was an English footballer who played as a forward for Athletic Club. Although little has been recorded of his life, he was one of the most important footballers in the amateur beginnings of Athletic Club, netting a goal in both the 1902 Copa de la Coronación Final and the 1903 Copa del Rey Final, which were the club's first pieces of silverware.

Biography
Born in Stoke Newington, he eventually ended up playing football in Spain and joined the newly created Bizcaya (a combination of players from Athletic Club and Bilbao Football Club) in 1902, which evolved into the extant Athletic Club shortly after. Together with Juan Astorquia, Alejandro de la Sota and Walter Evans, he was part of the teams that won the 1902 Copa de la Coronación (as Bizcaya) and the 1903 Copa del Rey, in which Cazeaux contributed with the decisive goal of a 2–1 win over FC Barcelona in the 1902 final, and a goal in a 3–2 comeback win over Madrid FC in the 1903 final. In the 1904 Copa del Rey Final, Athletic were declared winners again without playing a match after their opponents failed to turn up. Between 1902 and 1903, he played five competitive matches, in which he scored three goals (Athletic Bilbao counts the matches played by Bizcaya as its own).

Honours
Copa de la Coronación: 1902

Copa del Rey: 1903, 1904

References

Year of birth missing
Year of death missing
French footballers
Athletic Bilbao footballers
Association football forwards
French expatriate sportspeople in Spain
French expatriate footballers
Expatriate footballers in Spain